An election to the County Council of London took place on 3 April 1952. The council was elected by First Past the Post with each elector having three votes in the three-member seats. The Labour Party made substantial gains and greatly increased its majority.

Campaign
The Labour Party manifesto proposed increased slum clearance, new comprehensive schools, and new construction at the South Bank.  It targeted Conservative seats in Fulham East, Hammersmith South, Kensington North and Paddington North.

The Conservative Party hoped to make a small number of gains and take control of the council.  It targeted Labour-held seats in Brixton, Fulham West, Islington North and St Pancras North.  Its manifesto proposed working more closely with the government in building housing, closing civic restaurants, and halting the construction of comprehensive schools.

The Liberal Party stood only twelve candidates, and hoped to retain its representation in Bethnal Green.  The Conservatives stood only two candidates in the constituency, and suggested that its supporters voted for the Liberal candidate Nicholas Harris, son of retiring Liberal councillor Percy Harris.

Results
Labour won a significant majority in the election, gaining 27 seats, and increasing their vote share in almost every constituency.  The Conservatives had for some years received higher vote shares in council elections than at general elections, but this pattern was reversed.  The party was particularly surprised to lose a seat in Holborn and St Pancras South, which had a large business vote.

The Liberal Party lost its only seat on the council, and saw its vote share in Bethnal Green fall to less than half its previous level, although it did still beat the Conservative Party in the constituency.  The Communist Party also saw its vote drop severely, although it was able to beat the Conservative Party in its best constituency of Stepney.

Turnout in the election was up from 1949, with 41% of possible votes cast.  A record number of women were elected, comprising nearly one-third of the total number of members of the council.

References

1952 elections in the United Kingdom
County Council election
1952 English local elections
London County Council elections
April 1952 events in the United Kingdom